Kant Yearbook is an annual peer-reviewed academic journal covering the thought of Immanuel Kant published by De Gruyter. It was established in 2009 and publishes contributions in English and German. The editor-in-chief is Dietmar H. Heidemann (University of Luxembourg).

Abstracting and indexing
The journal is abstracted and indexed in:
EBSCO databases
Emerging Sources Citation Index
International Bibliography of Periodical Literature in the Humanities and Social Sciences
International Philosophical Bibliography
Philosopher's Index
PhilPapers
ProQuest databases
Scopus

See also
Kant-Studien
Hegel Yearbook

References

External links

Annual journals
Publications established in 2009
Works about Immanuel Kant
Kant
2009 establishments in Germany
Academic journals published in Germany
English-language journals